Matheus Simonete Bressaneli (born 15 January 1993), commonly known as Bressan, is a Brazilian professional footballer who plays for Chinese Super League club Nantong Zhiyun as a central defender. Bressan is a dual citizen of Brazil and Italy, having gained Italian citizenship on June 19, 2013. Bressan also has a green-card, which was issued on June 21, 2021.

Club career
Born in Caxias do Sul, Bressan joined Juventude's youth setup in 2005, aged 12. In 2010, he was promoted to the first team for the 2010 Campeonato Gaúcho, and made his professional debut on 21 March 2010, in a 1–3 away loss against Novo Hamburgo. He failed to establish himself as a regular starter, however.

In the second half of 2011, Bressan won his first professional title, the Copa FGF, acting as a backup, however. In April 2012, he went on a trial period at Ligue 1 side Lille, but nothing came of it; he was also a part of the squad which won the Copa FGF for the second time of the club's history.

In December 2012, Bressan signed with Grêmio, after a partnership between the Porto Alegre's club and Juventude was established. He made his debut for the new club on 3 February 2013, in a 2–1 away loss against Internacional.

After being made a starter by manager Vanderlei Luxemburgo, Bressan played the Copa Libertadores and was also runner-up of the Campeonato Brasileiro Série A, acting as a starter in both tournaments. In 2014, he was also a part of the squad which was runner-up of the Campeonato Gaúcho, but mainly as a backup.

On 27 August 2014, Bressan would sign a new deal with Tricolor until December 2016, being subsequently loaned to Premier League side Queens Park Rangers until June 2015. However, the deal collapsed a day later, after his agent, Marcelo Lipatín, revealed details of the negotiation for the media, thus bothering the directors of the English club.

On 23 December 2014, Bressan moved to fellow league team Flamengo, in a season-long loan deal.

On 21 December 2018, Bressan signed with MLS side FC Dallas. He debuted for the first team on April 13, 2019. Following the 2021 season, Bressan's contract option was declined by Dallas.

On 03 February 2022, Bressan signed with Avaí FC after being a free-agent for 2 months.

In March 2023, Bressan joined Chinese Super League club Nantong Zhiyun.

Career statistics

Honours

Juventude
Copa FGF: 2011, 2012

Grêmio
Copa Libertadores: 2017
Recopa Sudamericana: 2018

References

External links
Bressan profile. Portal Oficial do Grêmio.

1993 births
Living people
People from Caxias do Sul
Brazilian footballers
Association football defenders
Campeonato Brasileiro Série A players
Esporte Clube Juventude players
Grêmio Foot-Ball Porto Alegrense players
CR Flamengo footballers
Avaí FC players
Uruguayan Primera División players
Peñarol players
Major League Soccer players
FC Dallas players
Chinese Super League players
Nantong Zhiyun F.C. players
Footballers at the 2015 Pan American Games
Pan American Games bronze medalists for Brazil
Pan American Games medalists in football
Brazilian expatriate footballers
Brazilian expatriate sportspeople in Uruguay
Expatriate footballers in Uruguay
Expatriate soccer players in the United States
Brazilian expatriate sportspeople in China
Expatriate footballers in China
Brazilian people of Italian descent
Citizens of Italy through descent
Medalists at the 2015 Pan American Games
Sportspeople from Rio Grande do Sul